Manorama may refer to:

People
 Manorama (Hindi actress) (1926–2008), Indian actress in Hindi films 
 Manorama (Tamil actress) (1937-2015), Indian actress in Tamil films
 Manorama Madhwaraj (born 1940), Indian politician
 Manorama Thampuratti, 18th-century Sanskrit scholar
 Ruth Manorama (born 1952), Indian activist and politician
 Thangjam Manorama (1970–2004), Indian woman killed by a paramilitary group

Media 
 Malayala Manorama, daily Malayalam-language newspaper based in Kottayam, Kerala, India
 Manorama Weekly, a Malayalam-language magazine based in Kottayam, Kerala
 Manorama Music, a music company of India
 Manorama News, a Malayalam news channel
 Manorama radio, an FM radio station in Kerala
 Manorama (1924 film), a 1924 film
 Manorama (1959 film), a 1959 Telugu film
 Manorama (film), a 2009 Telugu film
 Manorama Six Feet Under, a 2007 Indian thriller film

Indian feminine given names